The 2011 Women's Oceania Handball Championship was the fifth edition of the Oceania Handball Nations Cup, held on 28 and 29 May 2011 at Wellington, New Zealand.

Australia and New Zealand played in a two-legged game against each other, the aggregate winner qualified for the 2011 World Women's Handball Championship in Brazil.

Overview

All times are local (UTC+13).

Game 1

Game 2

External links
Results at todor66.com
Oceania WC-Qualification tournament
Report on NSWHF webpage
Oceania Continent Handball Federation webpage

2011 in women's handball
Oceania Handball Championship
Hand
International handball competitions hosted by New Zealand
Women's handball in New Zealand
May 2011 sports events in New Zealand
Sports competitions in Wellington
2010s in Wellington